Daniela is a monotypic moth genus in the family Geometridae. Its only species is Daniela viridis. Both the genus and species were first described by Parra in 1996.

References

Geometridae genera
Monotypic moth genera